Cuisson Lake is a lake in the Cariboo Regional District of British Columbia, about  north of the city of Williams Lake. It lies immediately adjacent to Rimrock Lake. It was named after Lewis Cuisson.

References

Lakes of the Cariboo
Cariboo Land District